The 2015–16 Austin Peay Governors basketball team represented Austin Peay State University during the 2015–16 NCAA Division I men's basketball season. The Governors, led by 26th year head coach Dave Loos, played their home games at the Dunn Center and were members of the West Division of the Ohio Valley Conference. They finished the season 18–18, 7–9 in OVC play. As an 8 seed, they defeated Tennessee Tech, Tennessee State, Belmont and UT Martin to become champions of the OVC tournament. They earned the conference's automatic bid to the NCAA tournament. As a #16 seed, they lost to Kansas in the first round.

Previous season 
The Governors finished the 2014–15 season 8–22, 3–13 in OVC play to finish one game out of last place. As a result, the failed to qualify of the OVC tournament.

Roster

Schedule 

|-
!colspan=9 style="background:#A40936; color:#F9F4EA;"| Exhibition

|-
!colspan=9 style="background:#A40936; color:#F9F4EA;"| Regular season

|-
!colspan=9 style="background:#A40936; color:#F9F4EA;"| Ohio Valley Conference regular season

|-
!colspan=9 style="background:#A40936; color:#F9F4EA;"|Ohio Valley Conference tournament

|-
!colspan=9 style="background:#A40936; color:#F9F4EA;"|NCAA tournament

References 

Austin Peay Governors men's basketball seasons
Austin Peay
Austin Peay
Austin Peay
Austin Peay